EVM Pilot Project is an under process Electronic Voting Machine for the forthcoming general elections in Pakistan and giving the right to vote to Pakistanis living abroad.

The ruling party has already passed the bill in the National Assembly on the basis of majority in a joint session.

Controversy
Opposition parties have stated they will not run in the elections, saying the use of electronic voting machines is tantamount to rigging the upcoming elections.

The Election Commission has also expressed its concerns over the use of this machine and has submitted 37 points in this regard in writing to the Standing Committee.

References

Elections in Pakistan
Electronic voting by country
Politics of Pakistan